An A-Z list of films produced in Iraq:

0-9
2:30 min (2016)

A
Ahlaam (2005) 
Alia et Issam (1948)
Amira wal-nahr, al- (1982)
Ana Al-Irak (1961)
Another Day (1978) 
Aouda il al Rif, Al (1963)
Arouss Al-Phurate (1956)
Arzu ile Kamber (1952)
Ashiq, al- (1985)
Asuar, al- (1979)
Ayyam al-tawila, al- (1980) 
Alhodood Almultahebah (1986)

B
Basra sa'a Hidash (1963)
Babel habibiti (1988)
Back to Babylon (film) (Retour à Babylone) (2002)
Boy of Baghdad (2004)
Bekhal's Tears (2005) Kurdish
Blood of My Brother: A Story of Death in Iraq, The (2005) 
Bekas (2012) Kurdish

C
Churches in Iraq (1988)
Clash of Loyalties (1983)
El clásico (2015)

D
Dawn of the World (L'Aube du monde) (2008)
Doktor Hassan, Al (1960)
Dol (2007) kurdish
The Dreams of Sparrows (2005)

E
Europa (2021)

H
Heroes Are Born Twice (1977) 
Houses in That Alley (1978) 
Hudud al Multahiba, al- (1986)

I
In My Mother's Arms (2011) 
Iraq: War, Love, God & Madness (2010) 
Iraq in Fragments (2006) 
Irhamuni (1957)

J
Jiyan (2002)

K
Kilomètre zéro (2005) 
Kitar al Scia Saba (1961)

L
Lakposhtha hâm parvaz mikonand (2004) 
Layali al-azab (1964)

M
Marsiyeh barf (2005) 
Mas' Ala Al-Kubra, al- (1983)
Mashour zowaje (1961)
Memories on Stone (2014)
Min al mass'oul (1956)

N
Nabokodnassar (1960)
Nadam (1954)
Nahr, al- (1977)
Naima (1963) 
Niwemang (2006)

P
Poet of Cane, The (2000)

Q
Qadisiya, al- (1981) 
Qannas, al- (1981)

R
Ras, al- (1976)

S
Son of Babylon (2010) 
Said effendi (1957) 
Sari's Mother (2006)  
Sea Clamor (1987)

T 
Tiswahun (1955) 
The situation in Lebanon (1977)

U
U nergiz biskivin (2006) 
Underexposure (2005)

V
Voices of Iraq (2004)

W
We Iraqis (Nous les Irakiens) (2004)
Warda (1956)
Warrak al-Kharif (1964)
WMD: Weapon of Mass Destruction (2004)

Y
Yadul Kadar (1964)

Z
Zamioun, al- (1973)
Zaman Al-Hob (1990)
Zaman, the Man from the Reeds (2004)

External links
 Iraqi film at the Internet Movie Database